Yush (also Romanized as Yūsh) is a village in Sheykh Fazlolah-e Nuri Rural District, Baladeh District, Nur County, Mazandaran Province, Iran. At the 2006 census, its population was 154, in 57 families.

Yush lies in the Alborz Mountains and is known as the birthplace of Nima Yooshij, an influential contemporary poet and the father of the new-era poem in Iran.

On 28 May 2004 at 17:08 local time (12:38 UTC), it was the epicentre of the 6.3  Mazandaran-Qazvin earthquake, which left 35 dead and 400 injured.

References

External links 
Emergency Field Assessment Mazandaran Earthquake May 30–31 – Natural Disaster Taskforce

Populated places in Nur County